Nexstar Media Group, Inc. is an American publicly traded media company with headquarters in Irving, Texas, Midtown Manhattan, and Chicago. The company is the largest television station owner in the United States, owning 197 television stations across the U.S., most of which are affiliates with the four "major" U.S. television networks, and MyNetworkTV. It also operates all of the stations owned by affiliated companies, such as Mission Broadcasting and Vaughan Media, under local marketing agreements, and operates major TV network The CW through a 75% majority stake, two terrestrial television networks airing classic shows, Antenna TV and Rewind TV, and has full or partial ownership stakes in three pay television networks (cable news and entertainment network NewsNation and food and cooking networks Food Network and Cooking Channel, the latter two through a 31% stake in Television Food Network G.P.).

History

1996–2010: Formation

Nexstar Media Group was founded as Nexstar Broadcasting Group on June 17, 1996, initially backed by ABRY Partners. The first television station bought by Nexstar was WYOU in Scranton, Pennsylvania. Nexstar bought WYOU from Diversified Communications. The sale was completed on September 28 of that year. Nexstar promptly fired two beloved anchors and laid off several long-term staff members. Nexstar founder Perry Sook said that WYOU would be Nexstar's flagship station, keeping an office off the newsroom for years. In 1998, Nexstar purchased WBRE-TV in Wilkes-Barre, Pennsylvania. Because this was in the same market as WYOU, WYOU was 'sold' to Mission Broadcasting. This began the first-ever 'shared-services' agreement between stations. WYOU's sales staff was kept in Scranton while the production and news operations were moved to WBRE's offices in Wilkes-Barre. WYOU's staff who were not laid off were fired by Nexstar, hired by Mission, and eventually rehired by Nexstar. Mission Broadcasting then paid Nexstar to operate and control the production and news-gathering operations while Mission kept the sales and management team.

In 1997, Nexstar acquired WJET-TV in Erie, Pennsylvania from Jet Broadcasting, for which it paid $18.5 million.

On January 12, 1998, Nexstar acquired three stations owned by the U.S. Broadcast Group, including KFDX-TV, KBTV-TV, and KSNF, for $64.3 million. In 1999, Nexstar bought out WROC-TV in Rochester, New York from Smith Broadcasting.

In 2003, Nexstar acquired Quorum Broadcasting (owner of 10 television stations). Also that year, it purchased KARK-TV and WDHN-TV from Morris Multimedia. In 2006, Nexstar bought out WTAJ-TV and the licensee rights of WLYH-TV from SJL Broadcasting for $56 million.

On March 20, 2009, Nexstar operated television stations that were owned by Four Points Media Group through an outsourcing agreement. However, on September 8, 2011, Sinclair Broadcast Group announced its intent of purchasing the Four Points stations outright and took over the MSA for the stations that October upon Federal Trade Commission (FTC) approval of the deal (the Federal Communications Commission (FCC) gave final approval of the group deal on December 21, and the Sinclair purchase of the Four Points stations was completed on January 1, 2012).

2011–2013: Retransmission consent dispute with Fox
In 2011, Nexstar and Fox entered into a dispute over terms of reverse compensation; this occurred as Fox began to aggressively seek shares of earnings from retransmission consent agreements with cable and satellite operators as part of affiliation agreement renewals between station groups with affiliates whose affiliation contracts had already expired (and carrying the network's programming without a contractual agreement) or were near expiration. Reportedly, the amount from retransmission consent fees from cable and satellite operators that Fox wanted its affiliates to pay the network would be 25 cents per subscriber during the first year of the affiliation agreement, increasing to 50 cents by the fourth year. President of affiliate sales and marketing for Fox, Mike Hopkins, had said earlier in the year that the network would consider moving its affiliation to another market station as a last resort if existing affiliates did not agree to the terms for reverse compensation retrans sharing.

Fox dropped its affiliation from Nexstar-owned/managed stations in four markets, with three of the replacement stations adding Fox in addition to existing affiliations with the MyNetworkTV program service (owned by Fox parent company News Corporation). In Indiana, two markets saw Fox go from a primary affiliation of one station to joining an existing MyNetworkTV-affiliated digital subchannel of a competing Big Three station, with MyNetworkTV going to a secondary affiliation: in Evansville, Fox moved from WTVW (which then became an independent station and later joined The CW) to a MyNetworkTV-affiliated subchannel of CBS affiliate WEVV-TV on July 1, while in Fort Wayne, the Fox affiliation moved from WFFT-TV to a MyNetworkTV-affiliated subchannel of NBC affiliate WISE-TV on August 1. The network also moved its affiliation in Springfield, Missouri from KSFX-TV (operated in a duopoly with area CBS affiliate KOLR) to upstart MyNetworkTV affiliate KRBK on September 1, 2011, with both stations becoming independents. Nexstar chose to drop Fox from WFXW in Terre Haute, Indiana and re-affiliate with ABC on September 1, 2011 (becoming the only Nexstar station thus far to affiliate with another network following the removal of the Fox affiliation) as part of a long-term renewal agreement between Nexstar and ABC for the group's nine existing ABC stations, reversing a 1995 switch that saw Terre Haute losing over-the-air carriage of ABC programs (since then, ABC has been seen in the market via Indianapolis affiliate WRTV on area cable and satellite providers); the Fox affiliation then moved to a digital subchannel of CBS affiliate WTHI-TV which also added MyNetworkTV as a secondary affiliation. Nexstar's remaining Fox affiliates have since signed a renewal agreement through December 2013; In addition, following the settlement of Nexstar's antitrust lawsuit against WISE-TV's then-owner Granite Broadcasting, WFFT-TV reclaimed the Fox affiliation on March 1, 2013. Nexstar would purchase KRBK in late 2018, restoring its ownership of the Fox affiliation in the Springfield, Missouri market.

2012–2013: Expansion by acquisitions
In July 2012, Nexstar agreed to purchase 11 stations and Inergize Digital Media from Newport Television with two stations going to affiliate Mission Broadcasting. On August 12, 2012, Nexstar sold KBTV-TV to Deerfield Media, which entered into a JSA and SSA with Sinclair Broadcast Group to become a duopoly with KFDM-TV.

On April 24, 2013, Nexstar announced that it would acquire the entire group of Communications Corporation of America, KMSS-TV, KPEJ-TV, and most of the ComCorp-managed stations that are owned by White Knight Broadcasting would be sold to Mission Broadcasting while WEVV-TV and White Knight Broadcasting's KSHV-TV would be sold to a female-controlled company called Rocky Creek Communications, with Nexstar assuming operational control of those stations.

On September 16, 2013, Nexstar announced that it would acquire WOI-DT, KCAU-TV, and WHBF-TV from Citadel Communications for $88 million. Nexstar immediately took over the stations' operations through a time brokerage agreement. The deal followed Phil Lombardo's decision to "slow down," as well as a desire by Lynch Entertainment to divest its investments in WOI and WHBF; Citadel would continue to own KLKN, WLNE-TV, and its Sarasota properties. On March 5, 2014, the Federal Communications Commission approved the sale of these stations to Nexstar outright and the deal was completed on March 13. KCAU continued to use Citadel's standardized news sets, graphics and logos.

On November 6, 2013, Nexstar announced that it would purchase the Grant Broadcasting stations for $87.5 million. Due to Federal Communications Commission ownership regulations, one of the stations, KLJB, was spun off to Marshall Broadcasting Group, but is operated by Nexstar through a shared services agreement. The sale was completed on December 1, 2014. In 2015, Nexstar sold off the licensee assets of WLYH-TV, the CW affiliate to Howard Stirk Holdings.

2015–2017: Acquisition of Media General
On September 28, 2015, Nexstar announced that it presented an unsolicited offer to buy Media General for $4.1 billion (including debt). Per share, shareholders of Media General would receive $10.50 in cash and 0.0898 shares of Nexstar, a total equivalent of $14.50 per share. Nexstar's offer was seen by analysts as a maneuver to torpedo the merger of Media General with Meredith Corporation (announced on September 8). If Media General agreed to the counteroffer within a 20-day period, Nexstar would expand its portfolio to 114 television stations, pending spinoffs in markets where both own stations and federal approval. On November 16, Media General rejected the offer but agreed to negotiate after concluding its merge with Meredith.

On January 27, 2016, Media General announced that it had entered into a definitive agreement to be acquired by Nexstar in a deal valued at $17.14 per share, valuing the company at $4.6 billion plus the assumption of $2.3 billion debt. The combined company became known as Nexstar Media Group, and owns 171 stations, serving an estimated 39% of U.S. households. The company paid Meredith Corporation (whom Media General had previously proposed a merger with) a termination fee of $60 million and gave Meredith right of first refusal to acquire any broadcast or digital properties that may be divested during the purchase. The deal also included contingent value rights for Media General shareholders if it sold spectrum from its stations during the FCC's spectrum incentive auction.

On May 27, 2016, Nexstar announced the sales of five stations. WCWJ in Jacksonville, Florida, along with WSLS-TV in Roanoke, Virginia, was sold to the Graham Media Group; and KADN-TV, as well as KLAF-LD in Lafayette, Louisiana, was sold to Bayou City Broadcasting, with KREG-TV in Glenwood Springs, Colorado going to Marquee Broadcasting as part of a series of divestitures required following Nexstar's acquisition of Media General due to Federal Communications Commission ownership caps (the sale of the Roanoke and Lafayette stations are required as Media General and Nexstar both own stations in those markets). On June 3, 2016, it was announced that Nexstar would spinoff WBAY-TV in Green Bay, Wisconsin and KWQC-TV in Davenport, Iowa to Gray Television for $270 million.

On June 13, 2016, Nexstar announced that it would sell WFFT in Fort Wayne, Indiana; KQTV in St. Joseph, Missouri; KIMT in Rochester, Minnesota; WTHI-TV in Terre Haute; and WLFI in Lafayette, Indiana to Heartland Media, through its USA Television MidAmerica Holdings joint venture with MSouth Equity Partners, for $115 million. The divestitures were in order to allow Nexstar to comply with FCC ownership rules (specifically pertaining to national market coverage for station owners) in advance of the approval proceedings of the merger of both groups (Nexstar already owned NBC affiliate WTWO and operates ABC affiliate WAWV-TV in Terre Haute, and planned to acquire Media General-owned CBS affiliate WANE-TV in Fort Wayne).

The transaction was approved by the FCC on January 11, 2017, and the sale was completed on January 17.

2014–2019: Other events
On March 13, 2014, Nexstar announced that it would purchase Internet Broadcasting, for $20 million. The company had also recently acquired competitor Inergize Digital through its purchase of assets from Newport Television, followed by Enterprise Technology Group, a spun-off joint venture between LIN Media and Fox Television Stations. The providers were merged to form Lakana, led by former ETG CEO Phillip Hyun. On October 23, 2014, Nexstar bought out KASW in Phoenix from SagamoreHill Broadcasting and Meredith Corporation, and it was completed on January 30, 2015.

On February 2, 2015, Nexstar finalized its acquisition of Yashi, a location-focused, video-advertising and programmatic-technology company, for $33 million. On November 17, 2015, Nexstar announced its intent to purchase West Virginia Media Holdings' stations (WOWK-TV in Charleston, WBOY-TV in Clarksburg, WVNS-TV in Ghent, and WTRF-TV in Wheeling) for $130 million. The company took over the stations' non-license assets under a time brokerage agreement in December 2015 pending the formal completion of the deal, expected in late 2016. The two companies viewed the acquisition as being a complement to Nexstar's WHAG-TV, whose coverage area includes the Eastern Panhandle region. Nexstar CEO Perry A. Sook is an alumnus of WOWK. The sale was completed on January 31, 2017.

On August 1, 2018, Nexstar bought out KRBK in Springfield from Koplar Communications for $16.45 million, and also bought out WHDF in Huntsville from Lockwood Broadcast Group for $2.25 million. On November 1, 2018, Nexstar bought out MyNetworkTV affiliate KFVE in Honolulu from American Spirit Media as part of transactions requiring from the Raycom Media/Gray Television merger.

2017–2019: Merger with Tribune Media
On April 30, 2017, The Wall Street Journal reported that there were competing bids for Tribune Media from Nexstar and a partnership between 21st Century Fox and private equity firm Blackstone Group. However, on May 8, 2017, it was announced that Tribune reached a deal to be acquired by Sinclair Broadcast Group. On May 26, 2017, it was reported by DealReporter that Nexstar might be considering a bid to acquire Tegna Inc., although such a deal would likely require significant divestments due to ownership conflicts and exceeding the ownership cap.

On November 14, 2018, after Tribune cancelled its proposed sale to Sinclair, it was reported that Nexstar was a leading bidder to acquire Tribune. On December 3, 2018, Nexstar announced its intent to merge with Tribune Media for $6.4 billion ($4.1 billion for all of Tribune's shares in cash and $2.3 billion of Tribune's debt). The merger would give the company 216 stations in 118 markets, placing it just below the FCC's market cap of 39% of TV households and making it the largest owner of television stations in the United States. Nexstar planned to divest some stations and "non-core" assets as part of the merger.

In spring 2019, Nexstar launched Border Report, a website focusing on news stories from the Mexico–United States border.

On March 20, 2019, Nexstar announced that it would divest 19 stations to the E. W. Scripps Company and Tegna Inc. for a total sum of $1.32 billion, with Scripps receiving eight stations (WPIX, WSFL-TV, WTKR and WGNT, WTVR-TV, WXMI, KSTU, and KASW), and Tegna eleven (WATN-TV and WLMT, WTIC-TV and WCCT-TV, WOI-DT and KCWI, WNEP, WPMT, WQAD-TV, WZDX, and KFSM-TV). Of those stations, only WPIX was not associated with a duopoly, but rather its 
market size (an outright acquisition under current FCC rules would cause Nexstar to exceed the 39 percent cap). The transaction involving WPIX included a $75 million option condition allowing Nexstar to buy WPIX back between March 31, 2020, and the end of 2021. In the summer of 2020, the option was transferred to Mission Broadcasting (whose station acquisitions are largely funded by Nexstar) and exercised shortly thereafter. Nexstar stated that these divestitures would be used to help fund the sale and cover debt. On April 8, 2019, Nexstar announced that it would sell 2 additional stations (WISH-TV and WNDY) to Circle City Broadcasting for $42.5 million.

On April 3, 2019, Marshall Broadcasting Group sued Nexstar for breach of contract, alleging that the company was trying to "undermine" its operations so it could buy back the stations at a later date and lower cost in the present regulatory environment. The company also accused Nexstar of using the divestiture of stations to a minority-owned broadcaster as a token to gain FCC approval for the associated acquisitions. A carriage dispute with AT&T resulted in the removal of more than 120 Nexstar stations across 97 markets from AT&T's DirecTV, DirecTV Now and U-verse platforms, which began at 11:59 p.m. on July 3, 2019, and ended on August 29, 2019.

On August 1, 2019, the United States Department of Justice approved the deal between Nexstar Media Group and Tribune Media. The merger was approved by the FCC on September 16, and would be consummated three days later.

On November 5, 2019, it was announced that Nexstar would acquire Fox Television Stations-owned WJZY and MyNetworkTV outlet WMYT-TV in Charlotte, North Carolina for $45 million. In turn, it also announced that it would sell its duopoly of Seattle-based KCPQ and KZJO (along with Milwaukee-based WITI) to FTS in a separate deal worth $350 million. Nexstar made the transactions to pay down debt and consolidate operations in the Southeast. The sale closed on March 2, 2020. As part of a settlement between the parties in litigation over the failed deal, Sinclair had to sell two properties in Harlingen and Lexington to Nexstar Media Group for $60 million on January 27, 2020. The company's founder, Perry Sook, had once been a principal of Superior Communications, who owned the WDKY property, making the sale to Nexstar a homecoming of sorts. WDKY's transaction was completed on September 17, 2020.

2020–present: Launch of NewsNation, Nexstar buys CW majority ownership 

On January 15, 2020, Nexstar announced a national newscast called NewsNation on WGN America. The program launched September 1, 2020. On March 1, 2021, the WGN America channel was renamed NewsNation.

On October 22, 2020, Nexstar underwent a corporate reorganization, under which its primary subsidiaries of Nexstar Broadcasting and Nexstar Digital were merged into the operating subsidiary Nexstar, Inc.

A carriage dispute with Dish Network began on December 2, 2020, and ended by Christmas Eve, which resulted in the removal of at least 164 Nexstar stations in 115 markets, covering about 63% of TV homes, from its services.

On December 16, 2020, Nexstar announced it was purchasing BestReviews from Tribune Publishing for $160 million.

On May 20, 2021, The CW and Nexstar announced that they have reached multi-year agreements to renew network affiliation for The CW in 37 markets in across the country. Almost eight months later, on January 5, 2022, The Wall Street Journal reported that Nexstar is a potential leading buyer of said network, as CW co-owners WarnerMedia (since merged with Discovery, Inc. to form Warner Bros. Discovery) and Paramount Global explore options in selling a majority stake in the joint venture network; the three companies have yet to comment on the WSJ report. In late August, as confirmation to another WSJ report made last June, Nexstar announced that it has "entered a definitive agreement" to acquire 75% ownership in the network, while its current owners — Paramount and Warner Bros. Discovery — will each retain 12.5% ownership. Based on media industry reports, Nexstar would reportedly assume "a significant portion" of the network's current losses. The deal did not require regulatory approval, but had to perform financial closure conditions at the company's fiscal third quarter, i.e. by the start of October 2022, in order to complete the transaction; thus, Nexstar first took over operations of the network on August 15, with the transaction's full completion announced later on October 3.

On August 20, 2021, Nexstar acquired political news website The Hill for $130 million.

A new digital subchannel network, Rewind TV, was launched on September 1, 2021, featuring classic TV shows from the 1980s and 1990s.

Non-station assets
BestReviews
Border Report
The Hill
Lakana
LIN Digital
Yashi
Zap2it

Television networks
 Antenna TV
 The CW (75% ownership; with 12.5% each remaining by Paramount Global and Warner Bros. Discovery)
 NewsNation
 Rewind TV
 Television Food Network, G.P. (31% ownership; with remaining 69% ownership being held by Warner Bros. Discovery)
Food Network
Cooking Channel

Former
 Chicago White Sox Radio Network, originator via WGN Radio from 2018 until the end of the 2020 season, when ESPN Radio's WMVP became the team's radio partner
 Chicagoland Television, regional cable news channel
 TV by the Numbers, division of Zap2It; remains up in archive form, with no new content being added.
 The WB, a former television network in joint venture with Warner Bros.

Nexstar stations

References

External links

 

 
American companies established in 1996
1996 establishments in Texas
Mass media companies established in 1996
Companies based in Irving, Texas
Companies listed on the Nasdaq
Television broadcasting companies of the United States